Tomás Carbonell and Sergio Casal were the defending champions, but did not participate this year.

Carlos Costa and Javier Sánchez won the title, defeating Eduardo Bengoechea and José Luis Clerc 6–3, 3–6, 6–3 in the final.

Seeds

  Javier Frana /  Christian Miniussi (quarterfinals)
  Alberto Mancini /  Diego Pérez (first round)
  Gustavo Luza /  Guillermo Pérez Roldán (quarterfinals)
  Christer Allgårdh /  Pedro Rebolledo (semifinals)

Draw

Draw

References
Draw

1988 Buenos Aires Grand Prix
ATP